Wilhelm Schmid may refer to:

 Wilhelm Schmid (scholar) (born 1859), German classical scholar
 Wilhelm Schmid (painter) (born 1892) 

 Wilhelm Schmid (ice hockey) (born 1921), Austrian ice hockey player

See also:
 Willi Schmid, Wilhelm Schmid's nickname, an accidental victim of the Night of the Long Knives 
 Wilhelm Schmidt (disambiguation)